Cape Horn (also Hoorn) is the southernmost headland of Hornos Island at the Drake Passage, sometimes erroneously known as the southernmost point of South America.

Cape Horn may also refer to:

 Cabo de Hornos, Chile, a Chilean commune
 Cape Horn Biosphere Reserve, located in the extreme south of Chile
 Cabo de Hornos National Park, also located in the extreme south of Chile
 Cabo de Hornos, an oceanographic research ship operated by the Chilean Navy
 Cape Horn, the southernmost headland of South America 
 Cape Horn, Mendocino County, California
 Cape Horn, Placer County, California
 Cape Horn (Washington), a mountain in Washington state
 Cape Horn Interchange, a major freeway intersection on Highway 1 (the Trans-Canada Highway) in Coquitlam, British Columbia, Canada

See also

 False Cape Horn, the southernmost point of the large islands of the Tierra del Fuego group
 Cape Horner, a captain of a sailing ship which has sailed around Cape Horn
 Cape Froward, the southernmost point on the mainland of the American continent.
 Diego Ramírez Islands, the southernmost point of the American continent (including islands)